In mathematical analysis, Haar's Tauberian theorem named after Alfréd Haar, relates the asymptotic behaviour of a continuous function to properties of its Laplace transform.  It is related to the integral formulation of the Hardy–Littlewood Tauberian theorem.

Simplified version by Feller 
William Feller gives the following simplified form for this theorem:

Suppose that  verifies the following conditions:

1.
 

2. The integral

5. The integrals
    and     

Under these conditions

Complete version 
A more detailed version is given in.

with the following properties

1. For all values  with  the function  is regular;

2. For all , the function , considered as a function of the variable , has the Fourier property ("Fourierschen Charakter besitzt") defined by Haar as for any  there is a value  such that for all 

3.

is bounded on any finite interval (for the variable )

4. The derivatives

5. For sufficiently large  the following hold

Under the above hypotheses we have the asymptotic formula

References 

Tauberian theorems